Gabriella O'Grady (born 18 February 1997) is an Australian athlete. She competed in the women's 400 metres event at the 2019 World Athletics Championships. She did not advance to compete in the semi-finals.

References

External links

1997 births
Living people
Australian female sprinters
Place of birth missing (living people)
World Athletics Championships athletes for Australia
Universiade medalists in athletics (track and field)
Universiade bronze medalists for Australia